The Salton Sea State Recreation Area offers hunting, fishing, swimming, and camping to visitors on the northeastern side of the Salton Sea.

Recreation
The Salton Sea State Recreation Area is run by the California Department of Parks and Recreation.

The Recreation Area was one of the 48 California state parks proposed for closure in January 2008 by California's Governor Arnold Schwarzenegger as part of a deficit reduction program, not enacted then. The Recreation Area continues to be open to the public.

Flora and fauna
The Salton Sea Recreation Area is in the Colorado Desert section of the Sonoran Desert, in the Lower Colorado River Valley geographic region. The Salton Sea is a stop on a major flyway for migrating birds.
 List of flora of the Sonoran Desert Region by common name

See also
 Sonny Bono Salton Sea National Wildlife Refuge
 Salton Sink

References

External links
 Official Salton Sea State Recreation Area website
 Sonny Bono Salton Sea National Wildlife Refuge website
 
 Bird Checklist for the Salton Sea National Wildlife Refuge
 Mammal Checklists
 Amphibian and Reptile Checklists
 Fish Checklists

Protected areas of the Colorado Desert
Parks in Riverside County, California
Lower Colorado River Valley
Coachella Valley
California State Recreation Areas
Salton Sea